Photolateralis stercorarius, the oblong slipmouth, is a marine ray-finned fish, a ponyfish from the family Leiognathidae. It has been recorded from Indonesia, Philippines, New Guinea, Guam and Tonga in the western Pacific Ocean. It was first formally  described in 1907 as known as Leiognathus stercorarius by the American ichthyologists Barton Warren Evermann (1853-1932) and Alvin Seale (1871-1958) with the type locality given as Bulan, Sorsogon in the Philippines. It was more recently named as Equulites stercorarius, but was re-evaluated in 2015 as part of Photolateralis. It is the type species of the genus Photolateralis.

References

Leiognathidae
Fish of Thailand
Fish described in 1907
Fish of the Pacific Ocean